Hans Neleman (born 30 May 1960, Vlaardingen) is a Dutch-born international photographer and film director who lives in Connecticut and working in New York City. He is also the founder of boutique stock photography agency Win-initiative and its promotional magazine, WINk.

Biography
Neleman studied Fine Art at the Goldsmiths College of Art in London, England and specialized in photography and film while at the Polytechnic of Central London (now University of Westminster). Neleman then pursued studio arts at the master level at New York University before establishing himself in his field.

Neleman's personal work includes still lifes and assemblages, while his commercial work has included fashion and celebrity portraiture, as well as advertising campaigns for clients like Nike, American Express and Sony. In the 90s, Neleman also directed several music videos for bands like Toad the Wet Sprocket, The Judybats, and Die Toten Hosen.

Neleman has also had several books published. His first, Moko: Maori Tattoo (1999), delved into the world of the Maori. Silence (2000) features the photographer's unique still lifes and Night Chicas (2003) explores the world of prostitutes in Guatemala.

Neleman has most recently branched out from his photography. He first founded a boutique stock photography agency, WIN-Initiative, centered around youth culture imagery, and launched a quarterly online magazine, WINk. An international photography competition, 10 BEST 10, soon followed. Neleman also co-created an iPhone app for obtaining digital releases, iD Release

Exhibitions
2016 Lumière de L’Aube – Musee d’art contemporain de Lyon, France
2016 Royal Ontario Museum, Canada
2015 Biennale de Lyon, France
2015 Musee d’art contemporain de Lyon, France
2014 Musee du quai Branly, Paris, France
2013 National Gallery of Australia, Canberra, Australia
2009 Peabody Essex Museum, Salem, Massachusetts
2003 Ricco/Maresca Gallery, New York
2000 Musee d’art contemporain de Lyon, France
2000 Biennale de Lyon, France
1999 Holland Festival, Netherlands
1999 Cultura De Nuevo León y Drexel Galeria, Mexico
1998 Tabakman Gallery New York
1995 Schneider Gallery, Chicago
1994 Art Projects International, New York
1993 Eton Gallery Detroit, Michigan
1991 Visual Arts Museum, New York

Books
1999 Moko – Maori Tattoo,  
2000 Silence, 
2003 Night Chicas,

Articles
http://www.3ammagazine.com/artarchives/2004/jun/interview_hans_neleman.html
Trust ,3am Magazine 2004, Interview with Hans Neleman and Richard Marshall
https://web.archive.org/web/20100719063845/http://www.hasselbladusa.com/masters-2006/october---hans-neleman.aspx
Hasselblad Masters: October 2006 
http://pdngallery.com/legends3/neleman/
PDN: Legends Online
http://www.eagletribune.com/lifestyle/x1876420849/Faces-of-pride-Exhibit-features-photos-of-Maori-people-embracing-their-roots
Faces of Pride Eagle Tribune online Magazine, February 2008, Interview with Hans Neleman and Michelle Morrissey
http://pdngallery.com/legends3/index_intro.html
PDN Compare Hans Neleman and Duane Michals
http://aesthetic.gregcookland.com/2008/03/hans-neleman.html
The New England Journal of Aesthetic Research, Hans Neleman's Maori

References

External links
 
Hans Neleman Photography
Hans Neleman Painting & Assemblage
WINk Magazine

1960 births
Living people
Dutch photographers
People from Vlaardingen